Beth Shak (born November 8, 1969) is an American professional poker player, who has been playing professionally since 2004. She is also an entrepreneur and philanthropist as well as a shoe and handbag expert. Shak ran a private vintage designer clothing business for 10 years. Her most recent project is a custom designed poker chip set currently on pre-order at her website.

Listed as one of the most attractive poker players Shak has appeared in the World Series of Poker, CBS, Playboy's Poker Tournament, "Aces & Angels" at the Playboy Mansion, YRB Magazine's "Rock It" fashion spread, Social Life magazine, Shoeholics magazine, Good Morning America, The View, AOL.com's You've Got, The Today Show and MTV Cribs.

Shak has been featured on several television programs, including 20/20, Celebrity Nightmares, Millionaire Matchmaker, Poker After Dark and NY Ink. She has been a contributing writer to Cosmopolitan and PhillyMag and has been featured several times in the Huffington Post.
In 2012, Shak was listed by Philadelphia Daily News in their Sexy Singles for 2012. Shak was also mentioned in The New York Times for her role in a documentary about high heels.

Most recently she has released a poker chip set, featured on The Ellen Show 12 days of giving.

Poker career
Shak initially learned to play poker by logging on to Full Tilt Poker and using “play money” until she felt comfortable enough to start playing with real money. When she started playing live, she found it to be “very different” and had to learn not to let men intimidate her. She has said she wants to be known as a good player, not "a good player...for a woman." In 2007, Shak signed on as a Red Pro for Full Tilt Poker.

Shak has made three World Series of Poker final tables and has thirteen tournament cashes to her name. At her first final table, she lost to Jennifer Tilly. She placed 8th in the 2005 World Series of Poker Ladies' event, which was only her second live tournament. At the 2007 World Series of Poker Shak placed 2nd (out of over 800 players) in the $3K No-Limit Hold ‘em event.

Shak made it to the final day of Season 5 of the European Poker Tour (EPT) finishing in the top 30 out of over 500 players, according to the European Poker Tour season 5 results. Her most recent win was in Johannesburg, South Africa playing 7 card stud.

As of 2009, her total live tournament winnings exceed $450,000. Of those winnings, $363,118 have come at the WSOP.

Shoe collection
Shak owns approximately 1,200 pairs of shoes, including 700 pairs by designer Christian Louboutin. Her shoe collection has led to her receiving no small amount of media attention. Her shoe collection has been written about in many articles and she has made several TV appearances to talk about it. She was featured next to other celebrities such as Fergie and Kelly Rowland in the documentary God Save My Shoes, directed by Julie Benasra.

Handbag Collection
Beth Shak has an extensive handbag collection. She started it when she was 16 years old and added many unique handbags during her vintage clothing business and while traveling around the world playing poker and added to her collection while she was traveling. It was both a passion and an investment

Personal life
Shak was married to fellow poker player Dan Shak, but they divorced in 2009. A civil suit for a portion of her shoes was brought against Shak by her ex-husband, but was dismissed. Shak appeared on a November 2010 episode of "reality" television program, Millionaire Matchmaker, as a "millionairess" seeking professional dating help to find a life partner. She has three children. On June 9, 2016, Beth Shak married Rick Leventhal in Las Vegas. In April 2017, Beth filed for divorce after nine months of marriage citing "irreconcilable differences".

Shak has developed a clothing line which includes hoodies and tank tops with plans for a high-end shoe line and a line of lingerie.

Philanthropy
Shak is the founder and chair of the Deal Me In For Jed Poker Event benefitting The JED Foundation (founded by Phil and Donna Satow in memory of their son Jed), a non-profit organization working to promote emotional health and prevent suicide among college and university students. The event is hosted by Beth Shak and Jamie Gold. She comments, "I picked The JED Foundation to work with because what they stand for really resonated with me. My daughter has had a few challenges and it warms my heart to know that JED is out there to help and support kids like her." Celebrity guests include Zach Brown and DaQuan Jones and from the Tennessee Titans, Garry Gilliam and Jordan Hill from the Seattle Seahawks, Rick Leventhal, Constantine Maroulis, and Montel Williams - amongst others.

Shak is a philanthropist, playing in many charity poker tournaments, raising money for various charities, most notably the "All in" for Kids Poker Tournament (which she co-founded) for The Children’s Hospital of Pennsylvania’s Palliative Care program. She is on the board of the Wish Upon A Hero Foundation, the advisory board of ShoeRevolt.com, and is on a committee at Gift of Life. She supports the Make-A-Wish Foundation and attended the LeSean McCoy celebrity charity weekend.

Shak has created the " Beth Shak Charitable Foundation" in order to support charitable organizations that give back to communities. “Shades of Greatness Foundation Inc.” - The LeSean McCoy Foundation and the M. Night Shayamalan Foundation are among the organizations that she supports.

Having made a five-figure donation to St. Jude Children’s Research Hospital, she was allowed to host a private screening Hampton Arts Cinema in Westhampton in honor of her Yorkie (Mila Shak)’s birthday.

Shak co-chaired the Pink Tie Ball in 2005. She is on the committee of ONEXONE and she is also a supporter of American Red Cross, P.A.W.S., Redlight Children Campaign, Elizabeth Glaser Pediatric AIDS Foundation, and ASPCA.

Other charitable events/foundations Shak has supported include:
 'Ante Up for Africa'
 The annual 'Sunflower Children Texas Hold'Em Celebrity Charity Benefit'
 'Poker Jingle' for the Leukemia & Lymphoma Society
 'Celeb Hold'Em' event benefiting the Miracle Foundation
 Pledges towards the Pennsylvania Vet Working Dog Center

Media appearances

Mila Shak

Mila Shak is a brindle teacup Yorkshire Terrier owned by Beth Shak. Mila was born in Greenbrier, Tennessee, on July 12, 2012, and was adopted by Beth when she was less than four months old. She spent her formative years at a home in Bryn Mawr, Pennsylvania, with Sabine, another Yorkshire Terrier. Later, she moved to New York City, where she resides today with Beth.

Mila is a model who has been featured in multiple publications, including In Touch Weekly, the NY Post, Hamptons Pet and Shoeholics Magazine. She was on the summer cover of Hampton's Pet magazine. In early June Mila's Instagram account was hacked as part of an attack on Beth and the case was featured in the New York Post.

In honor of Mila’s 4th birthday, Beth hosted a private screening at Hampton Arts Cinema in Westhampton after making a five-figure donation to St. Jude Children’s Research Hospital.

References

External links
 Official website
 Twitter
 Instagram
 www.shoesrforever.com Shak's shoe website
 

American poker players
20th-century American Jews
Living people
Female poker players
1969 births
21st-century American Jews